Alejandro Zendejas Saavedra (born February 7, 1998) is a professional soccer player who plays as a winger for Liga MX club América. Born in Mexico, he represents the United States national team.

Early life
Zendejas was born in Ciudad Juárez in Mexico before moving to El Paso, Texas, in the United States at a young age. The MLS, U.S. Soccer, and FC Dallas websites all listed him as being born in El Paso, Texas. FC Dallas later confirmed that Zendejas had been born in Mexico.

Club career

FC Dallas
On October 1, 2014, Zendejas signed a homegrown player contract with FC Dallas, making him the 13th homegrown signing in club history. However, he was not eligible to play for the first team until the 2015 season. He made his professional debut on 1 May 2015, in a 4–1 victory over Houston Dynamo.

C.D. Guadalajara
On June 23, 2016, Zendejas signed with Liga MX C.D. Guadalajara. In order to meet with the club's tradition of only using Mexican players, Zendejas agreed to reject future U.S. national team call-ups and accept Mexico national team call-ups if they ever occur. Zendejas was registered with the first team and was given the number 29 jersey, the same kit he had at Dallas. Zendejas made his Liga MX debut on August 6, in a match against Querétaro.

Loan at Zacatepec
In a press conference, Chivas coach Matías Almeyda confirmed some youth players would be sent out on loan to sister club Zacatepec to get playing time. On 8 June 2017, Zacatepec announced they had signed Zendejas on loan. Zendejas scored his first professional goal in a Copa MX match against Cruz Azul. He scored his first Ascenso MX goal on August 12, 2017, against Murciélagos F.C. Zacatepec would go on to win 1-0 with his goal.

Necaxa
On June 29, 2020, Zendejas joined Club Necaxa on a free transfer.

Club América
On January 17, 2022, Zendejas joined Club América for $3 million.

International career

United States
Zendejas was a member the United States under-17 squad that competed at the 2015 CONCACAF U-17 Championship playing alongside future USMNT stars Christian Pulisic and Tyler Adams. Overall, he gained 27 caps and scored four goals for the U-17 national team. After joining Mexican club C.D. Guadalajara, Zendejas agreed to reject future U.S. national team call-ups and accept Mexico national team call-ups if they occur.

However, on January 17, 2023, Zendejas was included in the list of call ups for two friendlies against Serbia and Colombia as he never applied to FIFA for a one-time switch in affiliation to be allowed to appear for a Mexico national team.

In January 2023, Zendejas became the fifth player to earn caps for both national teams in the history of the Mexico–U.S. football rivalry and only the second Mexican-born to do so since Martín Vásquez.

On March 14, 2023, U.S. Soccer announced that Zendejas had officially committed to play internationally for the United States on a permanent basis.

Mexico
In August 2017, Zendejas was called up to the Mexico under-21 squad for games in China and Qatar, the start of preparation for the Olympics in Tokyo in 2020.

Zendejas received his first call-up to the national team by Gerardo Martino, and made his debut on 27 October 2021 in a friendly match against Ecuador, coming in as a substitute in the 65th minute for Uriel Antuna.

Controversy
In late August 2022, FIFA issued an investigation probe on the Mexican Football Federation regarding Zendejas' call-ups to friendly matches in October 2021 and April 2022, against Ecuador and Guatemala respectively, the matches themselves were non-FIFA regulated matches but nevertheless, Zendejas' national team allegiance was still under the 'legal' jurisdiction of the United States Soccer Federation, meaning that Zendejas had taken part in friendly matches for Mexico without consulting or filing a one-time switch to FIFA in order to switch national team allegiances, a violation of FIFA regulations.

On November 9, 2022, Zendejas’ attorneys revealed to media that the player was considering a one-time switch to the United States.

On January 19, 2023, FIFA ordered Mexico to forfeit two friendlies—a 3–2 loss against Ecuador on October 28, 2021, and a 0–0 draw with Guatemala on April 22, 2022— and pay a 10,000 Swiss Franc fine for using Zendejas in violation of regulations. The Mexico under-23 team was also ordered to forfeit three games in which Zendejas played.

Career statistics

Club

International

Honors
Guadalajara
Liga MX: Clausura 2017
Supercopa MX: 2016
Copa MX: Clausura 2017

References

External links
 
 
 

1998 births
Living people
American soccer players
United States men's international soccer players
United States men's youth international soccer players
Mexican footballers
Mexico international footballers
Mexico youth international footballers
Mexican emigrants to the United States
American sportspeople of Mexican descent
Homegrown Players (MLS)
FC Dallas players
C.D. Guadalajara footballers
Association football midfielders
Major League Soccer players
Liga MX players
Dual internationalists (football)